Archbishop MacDonald High School is an academic high school in Edmonton, Alberta, Canada.

Academic Reputation and Admissions 
Archbishop MacDonald High School is currently ranked as the top academic Catholic high school in the Edmonton School District. It is also considered the second best academic high school in Edmonton, only second to Old Strathcona Academic High School. Provincially, the school has the fifth highest academic school ranking.

Due to Archbishop MacDonald's capacity, prestige, and popularity, Archbishop MacDonald is the only Catholic High School in Edmonton with a selective admissions process.
Prospective students must have achieved a minimum of 75% in all grade 9 core subjects including English, Social Studies, Mathematics, Science, and Religion. In grade 10, all students complete a general honours program. Once students have completed one year of studies, they may choose to continue in one of three programs offered in grades 11 and 12: Academic, Honours, and International Baccalaureate (IB). Students may choose to take all courses in one program or choose different courses in different programs in order to complete their academic plan for success. In addition, prospective high school students must also complete a personal reflection as a part of their application.

Programs and extracurricular activities 
Archbishop MacDonald High School offers a wide range of programs and extracurricular activities, including International Baccalaureate Middle Years & Diploma Programs, Honour's Programs, French Immersion, French as a second language and Spanish language programs, after-school band programs, sports teams, and various clubs.

History 
Archbishop MacDonald High School opened in 1967. The school is named after John Hugh MacDonald, who was appointed Archbishop of Edmonton, Alberta in 1938. According to the school website, Archbishop MacDonald was "a visionary for social justice," who was known for his work in "eliminating discrimination" through his leadership and activism. Archbishop MacDonald High School has in the past, and continues to work alongside St. Joseph's Basilica and St. Joseph's Seminary of Edmonton.

Notable alumni
 Keith Krause – political scientist; Rhodes Scholar
 Bill LaForge - hockey coach with Vancouver Canucks 
 Theresa Lee – actress
 Jason Strudwick – professional hockey player with the Edmonton Oilers

References

External links 
School website

High schools in Edmonton
International Baccalaureate schools in Alberta
Catholic secondary schools in Alberta
Educational institutions established in 1967
1967 establishments in Alberta